Tom Willmoit is an American attorney, nurse and politician. He served as a Republican member for the 92nd district of the Louisiana House of Representatives.

Willmoit attended at the Southeastern Louisiana University, where he earned his bachelor's degree. He then attended at the Southern University Law Center, where he earned his Juris Doctor degree. Willmoit lastly attended at Louisiana State University, where he earned his Associate degree. He was specialized as a nurse. In 2008, Willmoit won the election for the 92nd district of the Louisiana House of Representatives. He succeeded Glenn Arsardi. In 2016, Willmoit was succeeded by Joseph A. Stagni for the 92nd district, in which he was voted as a councilman of the Kenner City Council. His term had lapsed on June 30, 2018.

References 

Living people
Place of birth missing (living people)
Year of birth missing (living people)
Republican Party members of the Louisiana House of Representatives
Louisiana city council members
Louisiana lawyers
21st-century American politicians
Southeastern Louisiana University alumni
Southern University Law Center alumni
Louisiana State University alumni
American nurses
Male nurses